In graph theory, a mixed graph  is a graph consisting of a set of vertices , a set of (undirected) edges , and a set of directed edges (or arcs) .

Definitions and notation

Consider adjacent vertices .

 
For the purpose of our application example we will not be considering loops or multiple edges of mixed graphs.

This walk is a path if it does not repeat any edges, arcs, or vertices, except possibly the first and last vertices. A path is closed if its first and last vertices are the same, and a closed path is a cycle if it does not repeat vertices, except the first and the last. A mixed graph is acyclic if it does not contain a cycle.

Coloring

Mixed graph coloring can be thought of as a labeling or an assignment of  different colors  (where  is a positive integer) to the vertices of a mixed graph. Different colors must be assigned to vertices that are connected by an edge.

Example
For example, consider the figure to the right. Since orientation assigns an ordering, we must label the tail with a smaller color (or integer from our set) than the head of our arc.

Strong and weak coloring
A (strong) proper -coloring of a mixed graph is a function  where  such that  if  and  if .

A weaker condition on our arcs can be applied and we can consider a weak proper -coloring of a mixed graph to be a function  where  such that  if  and  if . 

Existence
A coloring may or may not exist for a mixed graph. In order for a mixed graph to have a -coloring, the graph cannot contain any directed cycles. If such a -coloring exists, then we refer to the smallest  needed in order to properly color our graph as the chromatic number, denoted .

Computing weak chromatic polynomials
The deletion–contraction method can be used to compute weak chromatic polynomials of mixed graphs. This method involves deleting (or removing) an edge or arc and contracting (or joining) the remaining vertices incident to that edge (or arc) to form one vertex. After deleting an edge, from a mixed graph  we obtain the mixed graph . From Propositions given in, we obtain the following equations to compute the chromatic polynomial of a mixed graph:
 ,
 .

Applications

Scheduling problem

Mixed graphs may be used to model job shop scheduling problems in which a collection of tasks is to be performed, subject to certain timing constraints. In this sort of problem, undirected edges may be used to model a constraint that two tasks are incompatible (they cannot be performed simultaneously). Directed edges may be used to model precedence constraints, in which one task must be performed before another. A graph defined in this way from a scheduling problem is called a disjunctive graph. The mixed graph coloring problem can be used to find a schedule of minimum length for performing all the tasks.

Bayesian inference
Mixed graphs are also used as graphical models for Bayesian inference. In this context, an acyclic mixed graph (one with no cycles of directed edges) is also called a chain graph. The directed edges of these graphs are used to indicate a causal connection between two events, in which the outcome of the first event influences the probability of the second event. Undirected edges, instead, indicate a non-causal correlation between two events. A connected component of the undirected subgraph of a chain graph is called a chain. A chain graph may be transformed into an undirected graph by constructing its moral graph, an undirected graph formed from the chain graph by adding undirected edges between pairs of vertices that have outgoing edges to the same chain, and then forgetting the orientations of the directed edges.

Notes

References 
.

.
.

External links

Graph theory